Franklin is a city in Heard County, Georgia, United States. The population was 993 at the 2010 census, up from 902 at the 2000 census. Franklin is the county seat of Heard County. The city is named after Benjamin Franklin.

History
Franklin was settled in 1770, and was designated seat of the newly formed Heard County in 1831. The town was hit by a tornado just before midnight on March 25, 2021, with multiple areas in downtown being heavily damaged with the most severe damage being rated high-end EF2. The tornado later became violent and hit nearby Newnan, Georgia to the east at EF4 strength, indirectly killing one person.

Geography
U.S. Route 27 passes through the east side of the city on a bypass, leading north  to Carrollton and south  to LaGrange. Georgia State Route 34 passes through the center of Franklin, leading northeast  to Newnan and southwest  to the Alabama border. Georgia State Route 100 joins SR 34 for part of its path through Franklin, but leads northwest  to Ephesus and southeast 14 miles to Hogansville.

Demographics

2000 census
As of the census of 2000, there were 902 people, 349 households, and 203 families residing in the city. The racial makeup of the city was 69.07% White, 29.93% African American, 0.11% Native American, 0.33% from other races, and 0.55% from two or more races. Hispanic or Latino of any race were 1.11% of the population.

There were 349 households, out of which 31.8% had children under the age of 18 living with them, 30.1% were married couples living together, 25.2% had a female householder with no husband present, and 41.8% were non-families. 37.8% of all households were made up of individuals, and 22.6% had someone living alone who was 65 years of age or older.  The average household size was 2.27 and the average family size was 3.03.

24.7% of the population of Franklin were under the age of 18, 8.1% were from 18 to 24, 24.6% from 25 to 44, 18.4% from 45 to 64, and 24.2% were 65 years of age or older. The median age was 40 years. For every 100 females, there were 77.9 males. For every 100 females age 18 and over, there were 68.9 males.

The median income for a household in the city was $19,125, and the median income for a family was $23,571. Males had a median income of $29,583 versus $20,724 for females. The per capita income for the city was $14,142. About 27.8% of families and 28.3% of the population were below the poverty line, including 33.3% of those under age 18 and 29.4% of those age 65 or over.

2020 census

As of the 2020 United States census, there were 950 people, 421 households, and 215 families residing in the city.

Education

Heard County School District 
The Heard County School District holds pre-school to grade twelve, and consists of three elementary schools, a middle school, and a high school. The district has 132 full-time teachers and over 2,278 students.
Centralhatchee Elementary School
Ephesus Elementary School
Heard Elementary School
Heard County Middle School
Heard County Comprehensive High School

Old Heard County Jail

Pauly Jail Company of Alabama built the jail in 1912 for $7,500, using plans by Manly Jail Works of Dalton, Georgia. It replaced an older jail built in 1880 that had become unfit. The jail housed up to 16 prisoners upstairs. The Heard County Sheriff (there were eight sheriffs from 1912–1964) and his family lived downstairs. In the 1930s, two prisoners cut the window bars and escaped. Death row prisoners were held here, but the jail's gallows were never used. In 1964, a new county jail opened on the Franklin Square and the old jail closed.

The jail was listed on the National Register of Historic Places on January 27, 1981. In 1987 it was completely restored by the Heard County Historical Society. It now serves as a museum and historical center.

Gallery

References

External links
 Franklin Baptist Church historical marker
 Franklin Methodist Church historical marker
 Heard County Jail historical marker

Cities in Georgia (U.S. state)
Cities in Heard County, Georgia
County seats in Georgia (U.S. state)
Georgia populated places on the Chattahoochee River